Sullivan House, also known as Tumbling Shoals, is a historic home located near Laurens, Laurens County, South Carolina. It was built about 1838, and is a two-story, frame I-house dwelling, two rooms in length, and one room deep, with a side-gabled roof.  The house typifies the first post-pioneer permanent settlement in the lower Carolina Piedmont.

It was added to the National Register of Historic Places in 1973.

References 

Houses on the National Register of Historic Places in South Carolina
Houses completed in 1838
Houses in Laurens County, South Carolina
National Register of Historic Places in Laurens County, South Carolina